Andixius, is a genus of planthopper insects belonging to the family Cixiidae. The genus contains 4 species. Three species found in China, the other species from Japan.

Description
Head distinctly narrower. Clypeus with distinct median carina. Legs simple. Tegmina long and tectiform.

Species
 Andixius longispinus Zhi & Chen, 2018 - China
 Andixius nupta Emeljanov & Hayashi, 2007 - Japan
 Andixius trifurcus Zhi & Chen, 2018 - China
 Andixius venustus (Tsaur & Hsu, 1991) - China

References

External links

Auchenorrhyncha genera
Cixiidae